Le Cinq is a gourmet restaurant in Paris, France, part of the Four Seasons Hotel George V. Le Cinq opened in 2001 to much fanfare and rapidly achieved 1, 2, then 3 Michelin Red Guide stars under the direction of chef Philippe Legendre before being demoted to 2 stars. Chef Eric Briffard took over from 2008 until October 2014 when Christian Le Squer, formerly of the 3-star Michelin restaurant Ledoyen, became head chef. The restaurant regained its third Michelin star in 2016. Also in 2016, Le Squer was voted chef of the year.

See also
List of Michelin starred restaurants

References

External links

Restaurants in Paris
Michelin Guide starred restaurants in France